The 2017–18 Boise State Broncos men's basketball team represented Boise State University during the 2017–18 NCAA Division I men's basketball season. The Broncos, led by eighth-year head coach Leon Rice, played their home games at Taco Bell Arena as a member of the Mountain West Conference. They finished the season 23–9, 13–5 in Mountain West play to finish in second place. They lost in the quarterfinals of the Mountain West tournament to Utah State. They received an invitation to the National Invitation Tournament where they lost in the first round to Washington.

Previous season
The Broncos finished the season 20–12, 12–6 in Mountain West play to finish in third place. They lost in the quarterfinals of the Mountain West tournament to San Diego State. They received an invitation to the National Invitation Tournament where they defeated Utah in the first round before losing in the second round to Illinois.

Offseason

Departures

Incoming transfers

2017 recruiting class

2018 recruiting class

Preseason 
In a vote by conference media at the Mountain West media day, the Broncos were picked to finish in third place in the Mountain West. Senior guard Chandler Hutchison was named the preseason All-Mountain West Player of the Year.

Roster

Schedule and results

|-
!colspan=9 style=| Exhibition

|- 
!colspan=9 style=|Non-conference regular season

|-
!colspan=9 style=|Mountain West regular season

|-
!colspan=9 style=| Mountain West tournament

|-
!colspan=9 style=| NIT

References

Boise State Broncos men's basketball seasons
Boise State
Boise
Boise
Boise State